Brunei made its Paralympic Games debut at the 2012 Summer Paralympics in London, sending one representative to compete in athletics.

See also
 Brunei at the Olympics

References